Robert C. Nowakowski is a Rear Admiral in the United States Navy, who is currently serving as the Reserve Vice Commander, U.S. Naval Forces Central Command | FIFTH Fleet.

Education 
Nowakowski attended Northwestern University and graduated in 1992 with a Bachelor of Science in Biomedical Engineering.  He later earned a Master of Science in Mechanical Engineering from San Diego University, a Master of Business Administration from California State University San Marcos, and a Technical Engineer Program Management Certification from Stanford University.

Career 
Nowakowski's prior flag officer billet from October 2019 thru September 2021 was as Deputy Commander, Naval Education and Training Command Force Development and Deputy Commander, Navy Recruiting Command. From November 2020 thru May 2021, he was concurrently assigned as the Navy's Global Mine Warfare Commander (MIWC). From April 2021 thru May 2022, he was concurrently assigned as Task Force LCS, which is charged with improving the littoral combat ship program. In March 2023, he was nominated for promotion to rear admiral (upper half).

References 

United States Navy officers
Northwestern University alumni
Living people
Year of birth missing (living people)